Charles Cockerell may refer to:

 Charles Robert Cockerell (1788–1863), English architect, archaeologist, and writer
 Sir Charles Cockerell, 1st Baronet (1755–1837), English official of the East India Company and politician